The Ritz Theater (also known as the Milane Theatre or the Helen Stairs Theatre) is a historic theatre in Sanford, Florida, United States. It is located at 201 South Magnolia Avenue. On January 29, 2001, it was added to the U.S. National Register of Historic Places. After getting donations from Wayne Densch it has now been named the Wayne Densch Performing Arts Center.

References

External links
 Seminole County listings at National Register of Historic Places
 Florida's Office of Cultural and Historical Programs

Gallery

External links

 Wayne Densch Performing Arts Center

National Register of Historic Places in Seminole County, Florida
Theatres on the National Register of Historic Places in Florida
Tourist attractions in Seminole County, Florida
Performing arts centers in Florida
Vernacular architecture in Florida
Theatres completed in 1923
1923 establishments in Florida